Several other genera were invalidly named Leiosoma. The mite genus of Nicolet (1855) is now Liacarus. The echinoid genus of Cotteau (1860) is now Trochalosoma. The lepidopteran genus of Felder & Rogenhofer (1874) is now Erocha. The millipede genus of Silvestri (1897) is now Catharosoma.

Leiosoma is a genus of weevils.

References 

Molytinae